Jacob Anthony Chapman (born 22 October 2000) is an Australian professional soccer player who plays for English club Huddersfield Town, as a goalkeeper.

Career
Born in Wahroonga, Chapman spent his early career with Sydney United 58 and Marconi Stallions, before moving to England in 2018. He signed for Huddersfield Town in January 2019 following a trial, and spent loan spells in non-league at Ossett United and Gateshead. He moved on loan to Salford City on 1 September 2022.

Career statistics

References

2000 births
Living people
Australian soccer players
Sydney United 58 FC players
Marconi Stallions FC players
Huddersfield Town A.F.C. players
Ossett United F.C. players
Gateshead F.C. players
Salford City F.C. players
Association football goalkeepers
Australian expatriate soccer players
Australian expatriate sportspeople in England
Expatriate footballers in England
English Football League players
National League (English football) players